The Man Who Knew Infinity is a 2015 British biographical drama film about the Indian mathematician Srinivasa Ramanujan, based on the 1991 book of the same name by Robert Kanigel.

The film stars Dev Patel as Srinivasa Ramanujan, a real-life mathematician who, after growing up poor in Madras, India, earns admittance to Cambridge University during World War I, where he becomes a pioneer in mathematical theories with the guidance of his professor, G. H. Hardy, portrayed by Jeremy Irons.

Filming began in August 2014 at Trinity College, Cambridge. The film had its world premiere as a gala presentation at the 2015 Toronto International Film Festival, and was selected as the opening gala of the 2015 Zurich Film Festival. It also played other film festivals including Singapore International Film Festival and Dubai International Film Festival.

Plot 
At the turn of the twentieth century, Srinivasa Ramanujan is a struggling and indigent citizen in the city of Madras in India working at menial jobs at the edge of poverty. While performing his menial labor, his employers notice that he seems to have exceptional skills in mathematics and they begin to make use of him for rudimentary accounting tasks. It becomes equally clear to his employers, who are college-educated, that Ramanujan's mathematical insights exceed the simple accounting tasks they are assigning to him and soon they encourage him to make his personal writings in mathematics available to the general public and to start to contact professors of mathematics at universities by writing to them. One such letter is sent to G.H. Hardy, a famous mathematician at University of Cambridge, who begins to take a special interest in Ramanujan.

Hardy soon invites Ramanujan to Cambridge to test his mettle as a potential theoretical mathematician. Ramanujan is overwhelmed by the opportunity and decides to pursue Hardy's offer, even though this means he must leave his wife Janaki for an extended period. He parts lovingly with Janaki and promises to keep up his correspondence with her.

Upon arrival at Cambridge, Ramanujan encounters various forms of racial prejudice and finds his adjustment to life in England more difficult than expected. Hardy, though much impressed by Ramanujan's abilities, remains concerned about Ramanujan's ability to communicate effectively due to his lack of experience in writing proofs, but with perseverance, he manages to get Ramanujan published in a major journal. In the meantime, Ramanujan is diagnosed with tuberculosis and his frequent letters home to his wife remain unanswered after many months. Hardy continues to see much more promise in Ramanujan. However, he remains unaware of the personal difficulties his student is having with his housing and with his lack of contact with his family back home in India. Ramanujan's health worsens while he continues delving into deeper and more profound research interests in mathematics under the guidance of Hardy and others at Cambridge.

Janaki, after much elapsed time, wonders why she has not heard from Ramanujan and eventually discovers that his mother has been intercepting his letters, and withholding hers to him. Hardy makes special efforts to get Ramanujan's now recognizably exceptional mathematical skills accepted by the university, by nominating Ramanujan for a fellowship of Trinity College. At first, Hardy fails for reasons related to college politics and racial prejudice. By gaining the support of key members of the college, Hardy again successfully nominates Ramanujan as a Fellow of the Royal Society, thereby forcing his acceptance as a fellow of Trinity. Ramanujan is eventually reunited with his family in India, though his declining health, exacerbated by poor housing and harsh winter weather in England, ultimately takes its toll and leads to his death aged 32, soon after his recognition as a mathematician of international merit and importance.

Cast 

While Irons is more than 40 years Patel's senior, the real Hardy was only 10 years older than Ramanujan.

Production
Tamil actor R. Madhavan was initially selected to portray the lead role in the film after agreeing terms during January 2012, but the makers eventually decided they wanted an international actor to play Ramanujan.

Reception 
Film review aggregator Rotten Tomatoes reports that 63% of critics gave the film a positive rating, based on 131 reviews with an average score of 6.2/10. The critics' consensus reads: "The Man Who Knew Infinity might be a tad too conventional to truly do its subject justice, but Dev Patel (Srinivasa Ramanujan) and Jeremy Irons (G.H. Hardy) elevate the end result beyond mere biopic formula." Metacritic, which uses a weighted average, assigned a score of 56 out of 100 based on 26 critics, indicating "mixed or average reviews".

After the film's world premiere, Allan Hunter in Screen Daily found the film to be "a well-heeled, sincere production following the memories of Ramanujan's English mentor and friend... The film tells such a good story that it is hard to resist. The old-fashioned virtues of a well-told tale and a particularly fine performance from Jeremy Irons should endear the film to that supposedly under-served older demographic who like to turn out for a weekday matinee... Mathematics plays a key role in the story, but in a way that is entirely accessible, allowing the viewer to comprehend the advances that Ramanujan made and why his legacy remains so important almost a century after his death."
Deborah Young in The Hollywood Reporter found the film to be a "respectable but all too conventional biopic".

Mathematicians Ken Ono and Manjul Bhargava collaborated on the film, which has been praised by mathematicians and scientists for its accurate mathematics and authentic portrayal of mathematicians.
George E. Andrews, former President of the American Mathematical Society, praised the film for its moving portrayal of the deep relationship between Ramanujan and Hardy.
The London Mathematical Society proclaimed that the film "outshines Good Will Hunting in almost every way".
Reviewing the film for Nature, Andrew Robinson wrote that "the film took more than ten years to create. It is worth the wait."

Release 
Mister Smith Entertainment handled international sales of the film. Warner Bros. released the film in the United Kingdom on 8 April 2016. IFC Films released it in the U.S. on 29 April 2016.

See also 
 Ramanujan – a 2014 Indian biopic of Ramanujan
 List of films about mathematicians
 Partition (number theory) 
 Ramanujan's congruences

References

External links 
 
 

2015 biographical drama films
2015 films
British biographical drama films
Bertrand Russell
Biographical films about mathematicians
Cultural depictions of Indian men
Films about mathematics
Films based on biographies
Films set in Chennai
Films set in England
Films shot in England
Srinivasa Ramanujan
2015 drama films
Warner Bros. films
Films shot in Cambridgeshire
2010s English-language films
2010s British films